The 2004 Korean FA Cup, known as the 2004 Hana Bank FA Cup, was the ninth edition of the Korean FA Cup.

Qualifying rounds

Playoff round

Final rounds

Bracket

First round
Daejeon KHNP withdrew from the competition, and Jeonbuk Hyundai Motors won by default.

Round of 16

Quarter-finals

Semi-finals

Final

Awards

See also
2004 in South Korean football
2004 K League
2004 K2 League
2004 Korean League Cup

References

External links
Official website
Fixtures & Results at KFA

2004
2004 in South Korean football
2004 domestic association football cups